Tantei Opera Milky Holmes is a Japanese anime series produced by J.C. Staff, based on the media franchise created by Bushiroad. In a world where detectives and thieves battle against each other using supernatural abilities known as Toys, the story follows Sherlock Shellingford, Nero Yuzurizaki, Hercule Barton and Cordelia Glauca, a group of young detectives who suddenly lose their Toys and have to earn them back to avoid expulsion from Holmes Detective Academy. The first series aired in Japan on Tokyo MX between October 7, 2010 and December 23, 2010, and was also streamed on Crunchyroll. This was followed by a Summer Special episode which aired on August 26, 2011. A second anime series, Tantei Opera Milky Holmes: Act 2, aired in Japan between January 5, 2012 and March 22, 2012. A second TV special aired on August 25, 2012. A third season, Futari wa Milky Holmes, aired between July 13, 2013 and September 28, 2013, focusing on a pair of detectives named Alice and Kazumi who face up against a thief unit known as Color the Phantom. With the exception of Alternative and Futari wa, each episode is named after a piece of famous detective fiction.

Episode list

Tantei Opera Milky Holmes (2010)

Tantei Opera Milky Holmes: Act 2 (2012)

Tantei Opera Milky Holmes Alternative (2012 TV special)

Futari wa Milky Holmes (2013)

Tantei Kageki Milky Holmes TD (2015)

Notes

References

Tantei Opera Milky Holmes